Mailbox may refer to:

 Letter box (also known as a letter plate, letter hole, deed or mail slot), a private receptacle for incoming mail
 Post box (also known as a drop box), a public receptacle for outgoing mail
 Pillar box, a freestanding post box in the United Kingdom and the Commonwealth
 Email box, a destination for electronic messages 
 Mailbox (application), email management software for mobile devices
 Mailbox Birmingham, a retail complex in Birmingham, England
 The Mailbox (film), a short movie by the Church of Jesus Christ of Latter-day Saints
 Message queue, a means of interprocess communication in software engineering
 Pigeon-hole messagebox, also known as a cubbyhole, pigeon-hole or pidge
 a square-centric method of addressing a game board in game playing computer automatons - see Board representation (computer chess)

See also
 
 Mailbox baseball
 Mail (disambiguation)
 Box (disambiguation)